NGC 657 is an open cluster containing very few stars or a group of stars located in the constellation Cassiopeia. It was discovered by British astronomer John Herschel in 1831.

See also 
 List of NGC objects (1–1000)

References

External links 
 

Open clusters
Cassiopeia (constellation)
0657